On 29 March 2016, a Mitsubishi MU-2 operated by Aero Teknic, a Canadian aircraft maintenance company, crashed on approach to Îles-de-la-Madeleine Airport, killing former Canadian politician Jean Lapierre, several members of his family, and the two pilots. Lapierre was flying to his father's funeral with his wife and three siblings. While one man survived the crash, he died of a heart attack after being pulled from the wreckage.

Accident 
Before departure, Jean Lapierre mentioned that he was concerned about flying during bad weather. The aircraft left Montreal Saint-Hubert Longueuil Airport in Saint-Hubert, Quebec at 0931 Eastern Daylight Time and was headed to  Îles-de-la-Madeleine Airport, on Havre-aux-Maisons island in the Magdalen Islands, also in Quebec. A little over two hours later (1230 Atlantic Daylight Time), the aircraft collided with terrain in Les Îles-de-la-Madeleine, Quebec, about  short of the threshold of runway 07.

At the time of the accident, there was light rain and mist.

Investigation 
The Transportation Safety Board of Canada (TSB) opened an investigation and sent a group of investigators to the site.

Preliminary observations by the investigators indicated that the aircraft was in a slightly left-wing-low-and-nose-high attitude on impact. The wreckage was contained in a field 150 metres square about two kilometres southwest of Îles-de-la-Madeleine Airport; the aircraft had hit the ground and slid for 91 metres before coming to a stop. Examination of the wreckage showed the engines were running until the impact with the ground. The MU-2 was not fitted with flight recorders (which are not required for light aircraft), but a different type of onboard recording device was installed and it appeared to be intact. The wreckage was removed from the crash site and transported to the TSB's laboratory in Ottawa on April 6. The investigation has concluded. The U.S. National Transportation Safety Board sent a representative to the American-built plane's crash site. Mitsubishi also sent investigators to the site.

Victims 
The victims include the two pilots, Captain Pascal Gosselin and co-pilot Fabrice Labourel. Jean Lapierre, his wife, his two brothers and one of his two sisters were also killed.

Jean Lapierre was a former Canadian Federal Member of Parliament and former Minister of Transport in Prime Minister Paul Martin's cabinet. He was Paul Martin's Quebec lieutenant during Martin's time as Prime Minister, and a member of the Liberal party. Lapierre eventually became a well-known Quebec broadcaster and talk-show host.

Canadian Prime Minister Justin Trudeau, former Prime Minister Paul Martin, and Montreal Mayor Denis Coderre all expressed their sadness at Lapierre's death. The funeral of Lapierre and his wife was held on April 16 and was attended by the current Prime Minister Justin Trudeau and his wife.

References 

Aviation accidents and incidents in 2016
Aviation accidents and incidents in Canada
Magdalen Islands
March 2016 events in North America
2016 in Quebec
2016 disasters in Canada